Divjot Sabarwal is an Indian television actress who is known for portraying the character of Karantiya in Zee TV's soap opera Mrs. Kaushik Ki Paanch Bahuein and Bhavna in Star Plus's popular show Suhani Si Ek Ladki. She also starred in Zee TV's popular soap Pavitra Rishta as Madhuri. She is also a part of movies like Chillar Party, A Thursday, Jogi.

Television

References

Living people
Indian television actresses
Actresses in Hindi television
Year of birth missing (living people)